"Caso Arrumado" is a single by Ana Moura from the album Leva-me aos Fados. It was released on November 23, 2009 in Portugal.

Recording and production
In 2009, Moura began recording rough demos at World Village studios in Lisbon, Portugal.
The demos consisted of Moura's lyrical ideas over various backing tracks. The demos were later rearranged and real instruments were added to replace the samples or keyboards initially emulating them. All string and orchestral arrangements were recorded at World Village studios in Lisbon by Ana Moura and Jorge Fernando. The song was mixed at the studios by Jorge Fernando.

Music video
In its music video we can see Moura singing in a dark room like in the previous music videos, in the other hand, the room is full of white lights.

Official versions
 Album version - 2:22
 Single version - 2:22

References

External links
 Music Video at YouTube

2009 singles
Portuguese-language songs
2009 songs